The Woodingdean Water Well is the deepest hand-dug well in the world, at  deep. It was dug to provide water for a workhouse. Work on the well started in 1858, and was finished four years later, on 16 March 1862. It is located just outside the Nuffield Hospital in Woodingdean, in Brighton and Hove, England, United Kingdom.

In popular culture 
The Woodingdean Water Well has been featured several times in the Itch series, by Simon Mayo, as it is where the protagonist, Itch, dumps the radioactive element 126.

References

Water wells in England
Buildings and structures in Brighton and Hove